Pixabay.com is a free stock photography and royalty-free stock media website. It is used for sharing photos, illustrations, vector graphics, film footage, music and sound effects, exclusively under the custom Pixabay license, which generally allows the free use of the material with some restrictions.

The overall quality of the photos on the service has been described as "mediocre for the most part" and "variable", but covering a "wide range of subjects."

History
The site was founded in November 2010 in Ulm, Germany, by Hans Braxmeier and Simon Steinberger.

Prior to 9 January 2019, Pixabay images were released under the CC0 declaration, which deeds content into the public domain. On that day, it imposed a custom, more restrictive license on all of its content. and changed its license to the "Pixabay License", which prohibits the sale of unaltered copies of the licensed works, or distribution as stock images or wallpapers. As the terms of CC0 explicitly indicate that the surrender into the public domain is "irrevocable" once completed, images that had already been released under CC0 prior to the change in license remain available through various mirrors distributing under the original CC0 declaration.

In May 2019, Pixabay, along with Pexels, was acquired by the Australian design and publishing platform Canva.

References

External links 
 

Internet properties established in 2010
Multilingual websites
Image-sharing websites
Photography websites
Stock photography
Public domain databases